Zakayo Cheruiyot is a Kenyan politician who was born in 1954 at Kapsogut village in Bureti Constituency, Kericho County. His father, Arap Komuilong, was an Assistant Chief to Arap Tengecha, the Chief, during the colonial period. Cheruiyot attended Kapsogut Primary School prior to joining Litein High School and later Chesamis High School for his A-level education. The revered administrator holds a bachelor's degree in Literature and Governance (Political Science) from the University of Nairobi and a Postgraduate Diploma in Development Studies from Birmingham University in the UK. He is widely trained in public administration and has undergone major short courses on administration and management at the Kenya School of Government (formerly, Kenya Institute of Administration).

He was a District Officer in Central Province, then Deputy Provincial Commissioner for the Rift Valley Province from 1987. From 1997 to 2003, he was Permanent Secretary for Internal Security under President Daniel Arap Moi. He is credited for streamlining the security docket; reforming the uniformed forces and silencing militias and illegal groupings. To date, the impact of his reign as the Permanent Secretary in the Internal Security docket still reverberates. It is important to note, that during his term, there was no minister for internal security thus he reported directly to the President. He was dismissed by the incoming Kibaki government.

Hon. Cheruiyot's political career began after his early retirement from public administration following the triumphant entry of the National Rainbow Coalition (NARC) regime led by former President Mwai Kibaki (2003-2013). During the 2007 General Elections, Cheruiyot contested and ousted Hon. Moses Cheboi in Kuresoi Constituency before it was subdivided into North and South. His success was to a large extent, attributed to the development record and issues management as an opinion leader in the area during his reign as a career administrator. Serving as the area MP from 2007 to 2013, Cheruiyot utilized the Constituency Development Fund (CDF) allocations to further his development-oriented record occasioning his re-election in 2013. He built several schools and hospitals in the constituency. His “Amani na Kazi” slogan bore fruits that saw improvement in his constituents' education and economic welfare, spurring infrastructural development and fostering peaceful coexistence.

Hon. Cheruiyot remains one of the greatest political pillars, having championed the formation of the United Republican Party (URP) which has since been dissolved and merged to form the Jubilee Party. He decamped to Chama Cha Mashinani together with former Bomet Governor H.E. Isaac Ruto. He once belonged to the Orange Democratic Movement and was elected to represent the Kuresoi Constituency in the National Assembly of Kenya since the 2007 Kenyan parliamentary election.

He was re-elected as a Member of the National Assembly of Kenya under the new constitution for the Kuresoi South constituency in Nakuru County with the new United Republican Party (URP). He is a close ally of newly elected Deputy President William Ruto Samoei. He is friends with Emmanuel Kiprono Chirchir Kimberton, a consultant in Kimberton Consulting & Projects Limited, Head of Business and Marketing-Article Designs, Nairobi.
During his term as the area MP for Kuresoi Constituency (2007-2013), Cheruiyot was a Commissioner at the Parliamentary Service Commission. In his other term as Kuresoi South Constituency legislator, he was a member of the Security Committee and House Business Committee of the Parliament as well as a Kenyan representative at the Pan-African Parliament based in South Africa.

Passion and Development Record

The social-economic transformative power inherent in education is a realization that was deeply inculcated in Cheruiyot's mind at an early age. His substantial investment in educational facilities is informed by his tacit conviction and belief that – education is an effective weapon for confronting poverty and enhancing social equity. Cheruiyot has read extensively in management, leadership, literature, development, administration, and history. The reading has not only enriched his knowledge base but also sharpened his administrative acumen and widened his worldview on various critical social issues. His readership and leadership skills are unparalleled. He was once quoted in a local daily newspaper saying, God gave him sufficient wisdom. Anyone who has had a chance to interact with him can attest to this fact.

Right from his home village in Bureti to his own village in Kuresoi, Cheruiyot has sponsored development in many primary and secondary schools. During his tenure as the PS for Internal Security, he constructed Moi Secondary School-Amalo and Emitik Girls Secondary School. Both schools are today glowing case studies of the best institutions in the area. As the area MP, Hon. Cheruiyot founded and funded the construction of day secondary schools in every sub-location. This initiative has substantially contributed to enhanced access to affordable education opportunities in Kuresoi South Constituency. His education agenda has also seen the transformation of old dilapidated classrooms for various schools into modern, learner-friendly facilities. His ultimate goal and dream was to pioneer the establishment of a university in Kuresoi South Constituency.  This, however, was cut short in 2017 when he lost the seat to a Jubilee Party candidate. At the time of leaving office, he had already appointed a panel of experts drawn from university professors and education professionals who had already identified land at Keringet Shopping Centre where the university was to be set up.

The importance of a healthy populace in fostering national development has not escaped his attention: under his watch, the health sector at the constituency level has been fundamentally transformed. Hon. Cheruiyot has ensured that there is a health facility in every location. In addition, there have been laudable improvements in agriculture, roads, and security.

Cheruiyot has been a great champion of squatter resettlement and is largely credited for resettling the landless in Kuresoi. The former Kuresoi South legislator also advocated the lifting of land caveat imposed in the late 90s in parts of the Constituency so that the owners could have clean titles and transact business easily.

Personal Attributes

Hon. Cheruiyot is a suave, bold, and pragmatic leader. As a person and a public servant, his passion is serving the common mwananchi. As a charismatic leader, Cheruiyot is an ardent supporter of inter-ethnic peaceful coexistence in the region that is home to various ethnic communities. His approach to issues is skillfully diplomatic, thus endearing him to a cross-section of the multi-ethnic population. He started an Annual Peace Marathon in 2011 that demonstrated his steadfast commitment to national cohesion and integration initiatives.

Religious Beliefs

Z.K. Cheruiyot, a family man and a father of four, professes Christianity and is a great follower of Jesus Christ. His mastery of Bible teachings is impressive. He has supported the construction of churches across the Kipsigis region and in particular, Kuresoi South Constituency. Despite being a devoted believer of the African Inland Church (AIC), Hon. Cheruiyot occasionally attends church services and Harambee in all other churches.

Awards

For his exemplary and distinguished service to the Country, Hon. Zakayo Cheruiyot has been decorated and honored with the Moran of the Order of the Golden Heart of Kenya (MGH) and the Silver Star of Kenya (SS).

He is a Kipsigis by ethnicity.

Credible information indicates that Cheruiyot was involved in shielding Rwandan genocide suspect Félicien Kabuga from arrest and capture in the decade following the 1994 Rwandan genocide.

References

Living people
1954 births
Orange Democratic Movement politicians
Members of the National Assembly (Kenya)